The 23rd Shanghai Television Festival ceremony would be held on June 12, 2016 to June 16, 2016.

Winners and nominees

References

Shanghai Television Festival
2017 television awards